Per Holm (10 January 1899 – 8 September 1974) was a Norwegian football player for the club Sarpsborg FK, and military officer. He was born in Sarpsborg. He played with the Norwegian national team at the Antwerp Olympics in 1920, where the Norwegian team reached the quarter finals. He was capped 17 times for Norway, scoring one goal.

Being an aviator lieutenant in the Royal Norwegian Navy Air Service, he was held as a prisoner-of-war during World War II. He was first held at Grini detention camp, then in Schokken, Grune bei Lissa and Ostrzeszów in Nazi German-occupied Poland, from 1942 until the war ended.

He died in Tune in 1974.

References

External links

1899 births
1974 deaths
People from Sarpsborg
Norwegian footballers
Sarpsborg FK players
Norway international footballers
Footballers at the 1920 Summer Olympics
Olympic footballers of Norway
Norwegian aviators
Royal Norwegian Navy Air Service personnel
Grini concentration camp survivors
Norwegian prisoners of war in World War II
World War II prisoners of war held by Germany
Association football forwards
Sportspeople from Viken (county)